Colin Brown may refer to:

 Colin Brown (cricketer) (1878–1936), Somerset cricketer
 Colin Brown (RAF officer) (1898–1965), World War I flying ace with 14 victories
 Colin Brown (jockey) (born 1955), English National Hunt jockey active in the 1980s
 Colin Brown (film journalist) (born 1962), British editor-in-chief of Screen International
 Colin Brown (political journalist), British political journalist
 Colin Brown (American football) (born 1985), offensive lineman for the Buffalo Bills
 Colin Brown (artist) (born 1962), Scottish artist